Cem Zengi (born as Zheng Changgong 郑长弓 October 21, 1985 in China) is a male Chinese-born Turkish table tennis player. He has played for Fenerbahçe TT since 2006; he also has played for Quan Xing Si Chuan in China.

Major achievements
Played for Turkey 2008 Olympic Team in 2008 Olympic Games in China
3 time Turkish Super League Champion
1 time ETTU Cup Runner-up
2 time Save the Greate White Pandas Table Tennis Conference

References

External links 
Player profile on fenerbahce.org
Team page on fenerbahce.org

1985 births
Living people
Turkish male table tennis players
Chinese male table tennis players
Fenerbahçe table tennis players
Olympic table tennis players of Turkey
Table tennis players at the 2008 Summer Olympics
Chinese emigrants to Turkey
Converts to Islam
Table tennis players from Sichuan
Sportspeople from Chengdu
Naturalised table tennis players